In Greek mythology, the Arae (Ancient Greek: Αραι) were female spirits of curses, particularly of the curses placed by the dead upon those guilty of their death; they were associated with the underworld. Also they can curse men such that the cattle of the sun god Helios would have done if they were harmed by any man, as in Homer's Odyssey.

Mythology
The Arae are sometimes identified with the Erinyes.

Bacchylides' account

Aeschylus's accounts

Suda

Notes

References 
 Aeschylus, translated in two volumes. 1. Seven Against Thebes by Herbert Weir Smyth, Ph.D. Cambridge, MA. Harvard University Press. 1926. Online version at the Perseus Digital Library. Greek text available from the same website.
 Aeschylus, translated in two volumes. 2. Eumenides by Herbert Weir Smyth, Ph.D. Cambridge, MA. Harvard University Press. 1926. Online version at the Perseus Digital Library. Greek text available from the same website.
 Aeschylus, translated in two volumes. 2. Libation Bearers by Herbert Weir Smyth, Ph.D. Cambridge, MA. Harvard University Press. 1926. Online version at the Perseus Digital Library. Greek text available from the same website.
 Suida, Suda Encyclopedia translated by Ross Scaife, David Whitehead, William Hutton, Catharine Roth, Jennifer Benedict, Gregory Hays, Malcolm Heath Sean M. Redmond, Nicholas Fincher, Patrick Rourke, Elizabeth Vandiver, Raphael Finkel, Frederick Williams, Carl Widstrand, Robert Dyer, Joseph L. Rife, Oliver Phillips and many others. Online version at the Topos Text Project.

External links 
 ARAE from The Theoi Project

Underworld goddesses
Greek goddesses
Personifications in Greek mythology
Greek underworld
Chthonic beings
Vengeance goddesses